Noppawan Lertcheewakarn was the defending champion, but chose to compete in the ladies' singles competition instead as a wild card and lost to Andrea Hlaváčková in the first round.

Kristýna Plíšková defeated Sachie Ishizu in the final, 6–3, 4–6, 6–4 to win the girls' singles tennis title at the 2010 Wimbledon Championships.

Seeds

  Elina Svitolina (first round)
  Irina Khromacheva (quarterfinals)
  Tímea Babos (third round)
  Karolína Plíšková (second round)
  Monica Puig (third round)
  Nastja Kolar (second round)
  Gabriela Dabrowski (first round)
  Laura Robson (semifinals)
  Kristýna Plíšková (champion)
  Sachie Ishizu (final)
  An-Sophie Mestach (third round)
  Ons Jabeur (quarterfinals)
  Verónica Cepede Royg (first round)
  Sofiya Kovalets (first round)
  Yulia Putintseva (semifinals)
  Daria Gavrilova (second round)

Draw

Finals

Top half

Section 1

Section 2

Bottom half

Section 3

Section 4

References

External links

Girls' Singles
Wimbledon Championship by year – Girls' singles